The City of Winds is an unofficial, literary name for Baku, mainly because it is windy throughout most of the year. The name derives from the ancient Persian name of this locality: بادکوبه (Bādkube, lit. "pounding winds"). There are two winds common to Baku: cold and rough Khazri, and mild and gentle Gilavar. The former is associated with negativeness, while the latter is associated with goodness, forming an important chain in Azerbaijani mythology and beliefs that is related to the struggle of Good and Evil.

Despite having one of the dirtiest chemical industry centres of the former Soviet Union in one of its suburbs, Sumqayit, the air of Baku remains relatively clean since the winds dissipate the pollution.

See also
 Khazri
 Gilavar

References

Culture in Baku
City nicknames